Annabelle Prölß (born 30 March 1999) is a German figure skater who is best known for her pairs career. With partner Ruben Blommaert, she is the 2013 Cup of Nice champion and 2013 German national senior champion. She has also competed in singles.

Personal life 
Annabelle Prölß was born 30 March 1999 in Regensburg, Germany.

Career 
Prölß won the silver medal in single skating at the 2013 German Junior Championships.

Pair skating 
Prölß teamed up with Ruben Blommaert in October 2011. They won the junior pairs title at the 2012 German Junior Championships.

In 2012–13, Prölß/Blommaert made their Junior Grand Prix debut in Lake Placid, finishing 6th, and then placed 4th in Germany. They won gold medals in the junior events at the 2013 Ice Challenge and 2013 Bavarian Open. Prölß/Blommaert won gold in their senior national debut at the 2013 German Championships. They then finished 7th at the 2013 World Junior Championships.

In 2013–14, Prölß/Blommaert debuted on the senior international level. After finishing 4th at their first two events, they took gold at the International Cup of Nice. They received their first senior Grand Prix assignment, the 2013 Trophée Éric Bompard, after France's Daria Popova / Bruno Massot withdrew.

Programs

With Blommaert

Single skating

Competitive highlights

Pairs career with Ruben Blommaert

Singles career

Detailed results

With Blommaert

References 

 2012 German Junior Pairs Figure Skating Championships
 2012 German Junior Ladies Figure Skating Championships
 2011 German Novice Ladies Figure Skating Championships
 2010 German Novice Ladies Figure Skating Championships

External links

 
 

1999 births
Living people
Sportspeople from Regensburg
German female single skaters
German female pair skaters